Dermal Bram "Dee" Brown (born March 27, 1978) is an American former professional baseball outfielder. Brown played for the Kansas City Royals and Oakland Athletics of Major League Baseball and the Saitama Seibu Lions of Nippon Professional Baseball.

Career
Brown attended Marlboro Central High School in Marlboro, New York, where he played baseball and football. In football, he rushed for the second-most yards in New York high school history and scored 75 touchdowns. As a junior baseball player, he hit .470 with eight home runs. He committed to play both college baseball and college football at the University of Maryland, College Park, for the Maryland Terrapins. Brown was named to the ABCA/Rawlings High School All-America First Team by the American Baseball Coaches Association and Rawlings.

The Kansas City Royals selected Brown in the first round, with the 14th overall selection, of the Kansas City Royals in the 1996 Major League Baseball draft. Brown played for the Royals in parts of major league seasons from  through . On December 30, 2006, Brown signed a minor league contract with an invitation to spring training with the Arizona Diamondbacks and was assigned to the Tucson Sidewinders, Arizona's Triple-A affiliate. On May 30, 2007, Brown was traded to the Oakland Athletics for cash considerations. In December 2007, Brown signed a minor league contract with the Los Angeles Angels of Anaheim and spent the entire  season in Triple-A and became a free agent after the season. He signed a minor league contract with the Los Angeles Dodgers for the  season. He hit .295 with 19 homers and 80 RBI with the AAA Albuquerque Isotopes in 2009.

Brown signed with the Saitama Seibu Lions of Nippon Professional Baseball in Japan for the 2010 season and returned to the Lions in the 2011 season.

References

External links 

Living people
1978 births
Kansas City Royals players
Major League Baseball outfielders
Oakland Athletics players
African-American baseball players
Spokane Indians players
Wichita Wranglers players
Omaha Royals players
Trenton Thunder players
Harrisburg Senators players
New Orleans Zephyrs players
Tucson Sidewinders players
Salt Lake Bees players
Albuquerque Isotopes players
Sacramento River Cats players
Sportspeople from the Bronx
Baseball players from New York City
American expatriate baseball players in Japan
Saitama Seibu Lions players
People from Marlboro, New York
21st-century African-American sportspeople
20th-century African-American sportspeople